Gudmundrå may refer to any of a number of places in northern Sweden:
 Kramfors Municipality, formerly a rural municipality known as Gudmundrå
 Gudmundrå Court District, a court district in the former province of Ångermanland